The 2009 Superbike World Championship was the twenty-second season of the Superbike World Championship. It was the second season in which HANNspree had been the title sponsor of the championship. The South African round returned on 15–17 May at Kyalami for first time since the 2002 season that the Superbike World Championship had raced there; other changes in the calendar were the return of Imola after a two-season absence as the replacement for Vallelunga and the discontinuation of Brands Hatch as one of the British venues.

The season saw the revision of the Superpole system, as the single-lap format was replaced by a three-part knockout system: after two timed qualifying sessions, the twenty fastest riders were admitted to Superpole 1, then the first sixteen SP1 riders progressed to Superpole 2 and the first eight SP2 riders contested Superpole 3, which finally awarded the pole position. In addition, changing bike during a race (also known as flag-to-flag) was allowed in order to avoid interruptions caused by variable weather conditions.

Ben Spies won the championship in his rookie season, bettering Noriyuki Haga in a final round decider. Ducati were the winners of the manufacturers' championship, winning eleven races.

Race calendar and results

Championship standings

Riders' standings

Manufacturers' standings

Entry list

All entries utilized Pirelli tyres.

References

External links

 
Superbike World Championship seasons
World